From February 10 to June 9, 1992, voters of the Democratic Party chose its nominee for president in the 1992 United States presidential election. Arkansas Governor Bill Clinton was selected as the nominee through a series of primary elections and caucuses culminating in the 1992 Democratic National Convention held from July 13 to July 16, 1992, in New York City.

Background

Reforms
Although the McGovern-Fraser commission had recommended proportionality as early as 1972, this primary was the first to adopt the proportional 15% rule, still in place today, as the standard throughout the country. Any candidate receiving greater than 15% of the vote in a given congressional district (or in the case of New Jersey, state legislative district) would receive a proportional share of the apportioned delegates for that district or state.

Schedule and results

Candidates
During the aftermath of the Gulf War, President George H. W. Bush's approval ratings were high. At one point after the successful performance by U.S. forces in Kuwait, President Bush enjoyed an 89% approval rating. 

As a result of Bush's high popularity, major high-profile Democratic candidates feared a high likelihood of defeat in the 1992 general election. This fear was "captured perfectly by Saturday Night Live in a skit called 'Campaign '92: The Race to Avoid Being the Guy Who Loses to Bush,'" in which each prospective major candidate "tried to top the other in explaining why they were unfit to run" for the presidency.

Mario Cuomo and Jesse Jackson declined to seek the Democratic nomination for president, as did U.S. Senator and eventual Vice-President Al Gore, whose son had been struck by a car and was undergoing extensive surgery and physical therapy. However, Governors Bill Clinton and Jerry Brown and U.S. Senator Paul Tsongas opted to run for president.

Nominee

Withdrew during primaries or convention

Other notable individuals campaigning for the nomination but receiving less than 1% of the national vote included:
 Activist and conspiracy theorist Lyndon LaRouche
 Former Senator Eugene McCarthy of Minnesota
 Former Mayor of Irvine, California Larry Agran

Withdrew before primaries

Declined
 Senator and 1988 vice-presidential nominee Lloyd Bentsen of Texas
 Senator Joe Biden  of Delaware
 Former vice president and 1984 presidential nominee Walter Mondale  of Minnesota
 Senator Bill Bradley of New Jersey
 Senator Dale Bumpers of Arkansas
 Governor Mario Cuomo of New York
Former governor and 1988 presidential nominee Michael Dukakis of Massachusetts
House Majority Leader Dick Gephardt of Missouri
 Senator Al Gore of Tennessee
 Reverend Jesse Jackson of the District of Columbia
 Former senator and 1972 presidential nominee George McGovern of South Dakota
 Senator Jay Rockefeller of West Virginia
 Governor Ann Richards of Texas
 Former senator Pierre Salinger of California

Polling

Nationwide

State polling

New Hampshire

Primary race
Clinton, a Southerner with experience governing a more conservative state, positioned himself as a centrist New Democrat. He prepared for a run in 1992 amidst a crowded field seeking to beat the incumbent President George H. W. Bush. In the aftermath of the Persian Gulf War, Bush seemed unbeatable, but an economic recession—which ultimately proved to be small by historical standards—spurred the Democrats on. Tom Harkin won his native Iowa without much surprise. Clinton, meanwhile, was still a relatively unknown national candidate before the primary season when a woman named Gennifer Flowers appeared in the press to reveal allegations of an affair. Clinton sought damage control by appearing on 60 Minutes with his wife, Hillary Clinton, for an interview with Steve Kroft. Paul Tsongas of Massachusetts won the primary in neighboring New Hampshire but Clinton's second-place finish – strengthened by Clinton's speech labeling himself "The Comeback Kid" – re-energized his campaign. Clinton swept nearly all of the Southern Super Tuesday primaries, making him the solid front runner. Jerry Brown, however, began to run a surprising insurgent campaign, particularly through use of a 1-800 number to receive grassroots funding. Brown "seemed to be the most left-wing and right-wing man in the field. [He] called for term limits, a flat tax, and the abolition of the Department of Education." Brown scored surprising wins in Connecticut and Colorado.

On March 17, Tsongas left the race when he decisively lost both the Illinois and Michigan primaries to Clinton, with Brown as a distant third. Exactly one week later, Brown eked out a narrow win in the bitterly fought Connecticut primary. As the press focused on the primaries in New York and Wisconsin, which were both to be held on the same day, Brown, who had taken the lead in polls in both states, made a serious gaffe: he announced to an audience of various leaders of New York City's Jewish community that, if nominated, he would consider the Reverend Jesse Jackson as a vice presidential candidate. Jackson was still a controversial figure in that community and Brown's polling numbers suffered. On April 7, he lost narrowly to Bill Clinton in Wisconsin (37-34), and dramatically in New York (41-26). In addition, his "willingness to break with liberal orthodoxy on taxes led to denunciations from the party regulars, but by the end of the race he had been embraced by much of the Left."

Although Brown continued to campaign in a number of states, he won no further primaries. Despite this, he still had a sizable number of delegates, and a big win in his home state of California would have deprived Clinton of sufficient support to win the nomination. After nearly a month of intense campaigning and multiple debates between the two candidates, Clinton managed to defeat Brown in the California primary by a margin of 47% to 40%.

Clinton became the second candidate after George McGovern in 1972 to win the nomination without winning Iowa or New Hampshire. The same feat would be repeated nearly 30 years later by Joe Biden in 2020.

The convention

The convention met in New York City, and the official tally was:

 Bill Clinton 3,372
 Jerry Brown 596
 Paul Tsongas 209
 Penn. Gov. Robert P. Casey 10
 Rep. Pat Schroeder 8
 Larry Agran 3
 Ron Daniels 1
 Al Gore 1
 Joe Simonetta 1

Clinton chose U.S. Senator Albert A. Gore Jr. (D-Tennessee) to be his running mate on July 9, 1992. Choosing Gore, who is from Clinton's neighboring state of Tennessee, went against the popular strategy of balancing a Southern candidate with a Northern partner. Gore did serve to balance the ticket in other ways, as he was perceived as strong on foreign policy and environmental issues, while Clinton was not. Also, Gore's similarities to Clinton allowed him to push some of his key campaign themes, such as centrism and generational change.

Before Gore's selection, other politicians were mentioned as a possible running-mate, e.g. Bob Kerrey, Dick Gephardt, Mario Cuomo, Indiana Representative Lee H. Hamilton, Pennsylvania Senator Harris Wofford, Florida Senator Bob Graham, and Massachusetts Senator John Kerry.

The Democratic Convention in New York City was essentially a solidification of the party around Clinton and Gore, though there was controversy over whether Jerry Brown, who did not endorse Clinton, would be allowed to speak. Brown did speak at the convention by seconding his own nomination.

Another additional controversy concerned Pennsylvania Governor Bob Casey, who sought a speaking slot at the convention but was not granted one. Casey complained that it was because of his outspoken anti-abortion views: he had warned the platform committee that Democrats were committing political suicide because of their support for abortion rights. Clinton supporters have said that Casey was not allowed to speak because he had not endorsed the ticket.

Popular vote results
Total popular vote number in primaries:
 Bill Clinton - 10,482,411 (52.01%)
 Jerry Brown - 4,071,232 (20.20%)
 Paul Tsongas - 3,656,010 (18.14%)
 Unpledged - 750,873 (3.73%) 	
 Bob Kerrey - 318,457 (1.58%)
 Tom Harkin - 280,304 (1.39%)
 Lyndon LaRouche - 154,599 (0.77%)
 Eugene McCarthy - 108,678 (0.54%)
 Charles Woods - 88,948 (0.44%)
 Larry Agran - 58,611 (0.29%)
 Ross Perot - 54,755 (0.27%)
 Ralph Nader - 35,935 (0.18%)
 Louis Stokes - 29,983 (0.15%)
 Angus Wheeler McDonald - 9,900 (0.05%)
 J. Louis McAlpine - 7,911 (0.04%)
 George W. Benns - 7,887 (0.04%)
 Rufus T. Higginbotham - 7,705 (0.04%)
 Tod Howard Hawks - 7,434 (0.04%)
 Stephen Bruke - 5,261 (0.03%)
 Tom Laughlin - 5,202 (0.03%)
 Tom Shiekman - 4,965 (0.03%)
 Jeffrey F. Marsh - 2,445 (0.01%)
 George Ballard - 2,067 (0.01%)
 Ray Rollinson - 1,206 (0.01%)
 Lenora Fulani - 402 (0.00%)
 Douglas Wilder - 240 (0.00%)

Convention tallies
For President:
 Bill Clinton - 3,372 (80.27%) 	
 Jerry Brown - 596 (14.19%)
 Paul Tsongas - 209 (4.98%)
 Robert P. Casey - 10 (0.24%)
 Patricia Schroeder - 8 (0.19%)
 Larry Agran - 3 (0.07%)
 Ron Daniels - 1 (0.02%)
 Al Gore - 1 (0.02%)
 Joe Simonetta 1 (0.02%)

Vice presidential nomination
Clinton selected Tennessee Senator and 1988 candidate Al Gore to be his running-mate. Among others confirmed possible V.P. nominees, who were finalists of Clinton's selection were: 
 Jay Rockefeller, U.S. senator from West Virginia
 Bob Graham, U.S. senator from Florida
 Lee H. Hamilton, U.S. representative from Indiana.
 Tom Harkin, U.S. senator from Iowa
 Bob Kerrey, U.S. senator from Nebraska
 George Mitchell, U.S. Senate Majority Leader from Maine
 Paul Tsongas, former U.S. senator from Massachusetts
 Doug Wilder, Governor of Virginia
 Harris Wofford, U.S. senator from Pennsylvania

Clinton's list of finalists did not include Senator Bill Bradley of New Jersey and Governor of New York Mario Cuomo, who publicly disavowed interest in the vice presidency.

Convention tally for vice president
 Al Gore - was nominated by acclamation on a voice vote.

In popular media 
The story of the race was covered in the 1993 documentary film The War Room and fictionalized into the 1996 novel and 1998 film Primary Colors.

See also
 1992 Republican Party presidential primaries

Bibliography
My Life by Bill Clinton, 2004, Vintage.

References

 
1992